Ray Tallis may refer to:
 Rayden Tallis (born 1975), Australian rules footballer
Raymond Tallis (born 1946), British philosopher, doctor and writer